Sangeeta Bhabra (born 19 February 1974) is a co-presenter of the regional news programme ITV News Meridian.

Life
Bhabra was born in 1974, and describes herself as a "child of the 80s" and a lifelong avid fan of George Michael.
  Bhabra trained in journalism and achieved a Masters Degree in linguistics from St Mary's University, Twickenham.   She says during her journalism training began as a volunteer at Hospital Radio Reading.  She says her first commercial job was at County Sound Radio based in Guildford.

Bhabra first worked for Meridian Tonight as a regular presenter, reporter and Travel News presenter for the  Thames Valley edition of the programme.  She subsequently rose to be co-anchor of the defunct South East edition of the Meridian Tonight for a couple of years until February 2009.

Her catchphrase of Wherever you go, go safely proved to be a favourite with the viewers.

Meridian Tonight was reorganised in February 2009 and Bhabra took over as co-presenter with long-standing presenter Fred Dinenage.

Other work
Outside of news, Bhabra has presented special programmes for ITV Yorkshire about the IFA awards in Leeds in 2007.

Awards
In 2015, Bhabra won regional journalist of the year at the Asian Media Awards (AMA).

References

Sources

Further reading

External links
 

1974 births
Living people
English television presenters
British reporters and correspondents
Alumni of St Mary's University, Twickenham